The Man who lost his Shadow (Egyptian Arabic: الرجل الذي فقد ظله translit: El Ragol El-lazi fakad Zilloh) is a 1968 Egyptian film directed by Kamal El Sheikh. It is based on Fathy Ghanem’s story under the same name. The film stars Magda, Salah Zulfikar and Kamal El-Shennawi. The film is a member of the Top 100 Egyptian films list.

Synopsis 
The events of the film occur before the 1952 Revolution, Shawky is a revolutionary who struggles to build a new world. His friend, Youssef, rose in the world of journalism on the shoulders of his teacher, Mohamed Nagy, as he is an opportunist who sold himself in order to achieve his individual ambition and abandoned all human values and traditions with the aim of linking to a higher class represented by the aristocratic Souad. He struggles to build a new world in which his middle class and even the whole country will obtain social justice. Youssef's father assaults his maid, Mabrouka, and after his death, Youssef expels her with her son. However she knows the way to struggle so that there are no new victims like her. He reached it when social conditions changed after the 1952 Revolution. Then Mabrouka falls in love with Shawky.

Primary cast 

 Magda as Mabrouka
 Salah Zulfikar as Shawky
 Kamal El-Shennawi as Youssef
 Nelly as Baheya/Samia
 Emad Hamdy as Abdel Hamid
 Yusuf Shaaban as Anwar Samy
 Ali Gohar as Mohamed Nagy
Mahmoud Yassin as Saad
 Soheir Fakhry as Soad
 Nazeem Shaarawy as Shohdy pasha

See also
 Cinema of Egypt
 Top 100 Egyptian films
 Salah Zulfikar filmography
 List of Egyptian films of 1968
 List of Egyptian films of the 1960s

References

External links 
 

1968 films
1960s Arabic-language films
Egyptian drama films
Egyptian black-and-white films